Bogachyov or Bogachov (masculine) or Bogachyova (feminine) is a Russian surname. It is usually mixed up with the very similar Russian surname Bogachev (feminine  Bogacheva). Notable people with the surname include:

Ekaterina Lyubushkina (née Bogachyova in 1990), Russian volleyball player
Evgeniy Mikhailovich Bogachev, author of GameOverZeus malware
Gennadi Bogachyov (born 1967), Russian football player
Irina Bogacheva (athlete) (born 1961), Kyrgyzstani long-distance runner 
Irina Bogacheva (mezzo-soprano) (1939–2019), Russian opera singer
Nikolay Bogachyov (born 1953), Russian businessman and politician

Russian-language surnames